The LFG V 58 was a light sport aircraft built in Germany in the late 1920s.

Specifications

References

Biplanes
LFG aircraft
Single-engined tractor aircraft